Buffalo Creek is a  long 4th order tributary to Reedy Fork in Guilford County, North Carolina.

Variant names
According to the Geographic Names Information System, it has also been known historically as:  
South Buffalo Creek

Course
Buffalo Creek is formed at the confluence of South and North Buffalo Creeks in Guilford County about 2 miles north of McLeansville, North Carolina.  Buffalo Creek then flows northeast to meet Reedy Fork about 6 miles south of Osceola.

Watershed
Buffalo Creek drains  of area, receives about 45.5 in/year of precipitation, has a topographic wetness index of 439.98 and is about 19% forested.

References

Rivers of North Carolina
Rivers of Guilford County, North Carolina